Corey Cowick (born August 1, 1989) is a Canadian former professional ice hockey forward. He most notably played in the American Hockey League (AHL) for the Binghamton Senators and Springfield Falcons.

Playing career
Cowick was selected by the Ottawa Senators in the 6th round (160th overall) of the 2009 NHL Entry Draft. Prior to turning professional, he played major junior hockey in the Ontario Hockey League for the Oshawa Generals before emerging as a budding star on Ottawa 67's during Brian Kilrea's last year coaching minor hockey. On August 5, 2010, the Ottawa Senators signed Cowick to an entry-level contract. Within his tenure with the Senators, Cowick played in the American Hockey League with affiliate, the Binghamton Senators managing to win a Calder Cup in the 2010-2011 season.

After a single season with the Springfield Falcons, Cowick was signed to a one-year contract with the Florida Everblades of the ECHL on August 7, 2015.

Following the completion of his contract with the Everblades, Cowick left for abroad as a free agent to sign a one-year deal with Scottish club, Braehead Clan of the Elite Ice Hockey League on July 8, 2016. After a productive first season abroad, Cowick moved on to French club, Gamyo d'Épinal of the Ligue Magnus in May 2017, following in the footsteps of fellow EIHL players Matt Carter and Alex Nikiforuk who both moved to Gamyo from Nottingham ahead of the 2017–18 season.
 
Cowick was later released from his contract in France, and ended his seven year professional career after undergoing a second shoulder reconstruction. He joined the Canadian International Hockey Academy as a guidance counsellor and coach, while preparing for the ambition to pursue a firefighting career.

Career statistics

References

External links

1989 births
Living people
Binghamton Senators players
Braehead Clan players
Canadian expatriate ice hockey players in Scotland
Canadian expatriate ice hockey players in the United States
Canadian ice hockey centres
Elmira Jackals (ECHL) players
Florida Everblades players
Ice hockey people from Ottawa
Oshawa Generals players
Ottawa 67's players
Ottawa Senators draft picks
Springfield Falcons players